Das ist Walter is the debut studio album by Yugoslav band Zabranjeno Pušenje released on April 10, 1984. It was released through Jugoton in Yugoslavia.

The album title is the closing line from the 1972 partisan film Walter Defends Sarajevo and it refers to the city of Sarajevo. The first track is the theme from the film. The album recording began in November 1983 in Studio 17 that was located in record producer Mahmut Paša Ferović's house.

Released by Jugoton, the record was out in limited circulation of 3,000 copies, indicative of the label's modest expectations, however, it started selling surprisingly well, eventually crossing the mark of 100,000 copies sold. It also received plenty of accolades, including making the list of top 100 albums in the history of pop and rock music in Yugoslavia published in the 1998 book YU 100: The Greatest Yugoslav Rock and Pop Music Albums. Das ist Walter is listed in the 87th place.

The album was re-released in 2000 by Nimfa Sound.

Recording

After gigging locally throughout 1982 and 1983 in their hometown Sarajevo at various university student clubs such as Kuk, Trasa, and CEDUS, Zabranjeno Pušenje was ready to take the next step — releasing a studio album. Consisting of seven energetic youngsters in their early 20s, itching to increase their profile on the scene, they recorded demos for some dozen tracks during spring 1983 in a studio in Kiseljak. The lineup that recorded the demos was – frontman and vocalist Dr. Nele Karajlić, rhythm guitar player and main songwriter Sejo Sexon, lead guitarist Mujo Snažni, bassist Samir "Ćera I" Ćeramida, drummer Zenit "FuDo" Đozić, keyboards player Seid Mali Karajlić, and saxophonist Ogi Gajić.

At one of their gigs in Sarajevo's Trasa club sometime during summer 1983, the Zabranjeno Pušenje youngsters were seen by 33-year-old Milić Vukašinović, established musician from Sarajevo at the time fronting his band Vatreni Poljubac having already experienced a measure of fame as former drummer of Bijelo Dugme during the 1970s. They also gave him their demo tapes at the gig. Liking what he saw and heard, Vukašinović put them in touch with his friend and former Čičak bandmate from the late 1960s, Mahmut "Paša" Ferović, who now owned a modest recording studio located in his own house where he worked as producer.

Going into the studio to record the album, Zabranjeno Pušenje made some personnel changes compared to the lineup that recorded the demos six months earlier. The band got a new rhythm section with Munja Mitić and Šeki Gayton becoming new bassist and drummer, respectively. Produced by Ferović himself, the recording sessions began in November 1983 and took almost 7 months to complete due to various extenuating circumstances. Karajlić said the following about the recording sessions: 

The band's rhythm guitarist and main lyrics writer Sejo Sexon remembers the recording sessions as follows: 

Midway through the recording session, the young band got a hold of Raka Marić, Bijelo Dugme's manager, who helped them find a record label that would release the material. He first offered it to PGP RTB, but after they refused it, Marić contacted Jugoton's creative director Siniša Škarica who accepted it.

Track listing
Source: Discogs

Personnel
Credits adapted from the album's liner notes.

Zabranjeno pušenje
 Sejo Sexon – rhythm guitar
 Mladen Mitić Munja – bass
 Mustafa Čengić Mujo – solo guitar
 Predrag Rakić Šeki – drums, backing vocals 
 Ognjen Gajić – saxophone, flute 
 Dražen Janković (credited as Seid Karajlić) – organ, keyboards, backing vocals 
 Nele Karajlić – lead vocals

Additional musicians
 Aida, Snježa and Haris – backing vocals (tracks A4, A5, A6, B1, B2, B4)
 Benja, Yooroe, Dado and Mujo – backing vocals (tracks A2, A3, B5)

Production
 Mahmut Paša Ferović – production, recording (Studio 17 in Sarajevo, YU)
 Silvano Bulešić – mastering (Jugoton in Zagreb, YU)
 Radomir Marić Raka – executive production
 Vukašin Babović – organizing 
 Milić Vukašinović – supporting 
 Dubravko Majnarić – editor-in-chief (Jugoton in Zagreb, YU)
 Siniša Škarica – music editor (Jugoton in Zagreb, YU)

Design
 Nenad Vasilijević – design, photos
 Rade Kosanović – design
 Nebojša Žigić –  photos (Studio Ada in Belgrade, YU)
 Miloje Stevanić Đakon – photographic printing

Legacy
In 2015 Das ist Walter album cover was ranked 41st on the list of 100 Greatest Album Covers of Yugoslav Rock published by web magazine Balkanrock.

See also 
 New wave music in Yugoslavia

References

1984 debut albums
Zabranjeno Pušenje albums
New Primitivism albums